Redfield is a city in Bourbon County, Kansas, United States.  As of the 2020 census, the population of the city was 90.

History
Redfield was founded in 1866. The city was named for Dr. Redfield, an early settler. The first post office in Redfield was established in 1872. Throughout the twentieth century the town was served by the Missouri Pacific Railroad.

Geography
Redfield is located at  (37.836301, -94.880922), along the Marmaton River.

Climate
The climate in this area is characterized by hot, humid summers and generally mild to cool winters.  According to the Köppen Climate Classification system, Redfield has a humid subtropical climate, abbreviated "Cfa" on climate maps.

Demographics

2010 census
As of the census of 2010, there were 146 people, 53 households, and 33 families residing in the city. The racial makeup of the city was 91.8% White, 2.1% African American, 2.7% Native American, and 3.4% from two or more races. Hispanic or Latino of any race were 4.1% of the population.

There were 53 households, of which 35.8% had children under the age of 18 living with them, 39.6% were married couples living together, 13.2% had a female householder with no husband present, 9.4% had a male householder with no wife present, and 37.7% were non-families. 35.8% of all households were made up of individuals, and 18.8% had someone living alone who was 65 years of age or older. The average household size was 2.75 and the average family size was 3.55.

The median age in the city was 29.5 years. 32.9% of residents were under the age of 18; 9.6% were between the ages of 18 and 24; 20.6% were from 25 to 44; 22.6% were from 45 to 64; and 14.4% were 65 years of age or older. The gender makeup of the city was 43.8% male and 56.2% female.

2000 census
As of the census of 2000, there were 140 people, 55 households, and 37 families residing in the city. The racial makeup of the city was 95.00% White, 1.43% Native American, and 3.57% from two or more races. Hispanic or Latino of any race were 3.57% of the population.

There were 55 households, out of which 34.5% had children under the age of 18 living with them, 52.7% were married couples living together, 9.1% had a female householder with no husband present, and 32.7% were non-families. 27.3% of all households were made up of individuals, and 9.1% had someone living alone who was 65 years of age or older. The average household size was 2.55 and the average family size was 3.11.

In the city, the population was spread out, with 30.7% under the age of 18, 5.7% from 18 to 24, 27.9% from 25 to 44, 27.9% from 45 to 64, and 7.9% who were 65 years of age or older. The median age was 35 years. For every 100 females, there were 105.9 males. For every 100 females age 18 and over, there were 86.5 males.

The median income for a household in the city was $23,333, and the median income for a family was $28,750. Males had a median income of $22,188 versus $13,594 for females. The per capita income for the city was $10,351. There were 40.5% of families and 36.7% of the population living below the poverty line, including 52.0% of under eighteens and 28.6% of those over 64.

Education
The community is served by Uniontown USD 235 public school district.

Notable people 
 Richard Christy, Drummer for Death, Radio Personality, The Howard Stern Show
 Elmer McCollum, biochemist, co-discovered Vitamin A

References

Further reading

External links
 Redfield - Directory of Public Officials
 Redfield city map, KDOT

Cities in Kansas
Cities in Bourbon County, Kansas